Bernadett Zágor (born 31 January 1990) is a Hungarian football forward currently playing in the ÖFB-Frauenliga for SKN St. Pölten. She is a member of the Hungarian national team.

International goals

References

External links
 

1990 births
Living people
Hungarian women's footballers
Ferencvárosi TC (women) footballers
MTK Hungária FC (women) players
Women's association football forwards
Hungary women's international footballers
People from Veszprém
Sportspeople from Veszprém County